Knollwood is a city in Grayson County, Texas, United States. The population was 432 at the 2010 census. It is part of the Sherman–Denison metropolitan statistical area.

Geography
It is bordered to the south by the city of Sherman, the county seat.

Demographics

At the 2000 census, 375 people, 143 households, and 91 families were residing in the city. The population density was 1,196.4 per square mile (467.1/km). The 150 housing units averaged 478.6/sq mi (186.8/km). The racial makeup of the city was 87.73% White, 5.87% African American, 0.53% Native American, 1.07% Asian, 0.53% Pacific Islander, 3.20% from other races, and 1.07% from two or more races. Hispanics or Latinos of any race were 6.13% of the population.

Of the 143 households, 39.2% had children under the age of 18 living with them, 44.8% were married couples living together, 16.1% had a female householder with no husband present, and 35.7% were not families. About 28.0% of all households were made up of individuals, and 3.5% had someone living alone who was 65 years of age or older. The average household size was 2.62 and the average family size was 3.25.

The city's population was distributed as 31.5% under the age of 18, 11.2% from 18 to 24, 36.0% from 25 to 44, 17.6% from 45 to 64, and 3.7% who were 65 years of age or older. The median age was 28 years. For every 100 females, there were 94.3 males. For every 100 females age 18 and over, there were 81.0 males.

The median household income was $30,893 and the median family income was $32,813. Males had a median income of $21,125 and females $17,417. The per capita income for the city was $13,497. About 1.1% of families and 2.5% of the population were below the poverty line, including 1.9% of those under age 18 and 14.3% of those age 65 or over.

Education 
Knollwood is served by Sherman Independent School District.

Climate
The climate in this area is characterized by hot, humid summers and generally mild to cool winters.  According to the Köppen climate classification, Knollwood has a humid subtropical climate, Cfa on climate maps.

References

External links
 Knollwood, Texas is at coordinates .
 Knollwood, Texas at the Handbook of Texas Online.

Cities in Grayson County, Texas
Cities in Texas